10 That Changed America is a series of television documentary films about the history of architecture and urban planning produced by US public service broadcaster PBS member station WTTW from 2013 to 2018. The series is presented by Geoffrey Baer and produced by Dan Protess.

The series comprises seven separate films, each approximately 55 minutes in length. The initial episode on 10 Buildings That Changed America was broadcast in 2013. A three part season 1 comprising episodes on 10 Homes, 10 Towns and 10 Parks followed in 2016.

Season 2 with three further episodes covering 10 Streets, 10 Monuments and 10 Modern Marvels aired in July 2018.

10 Buildings That Changed America

10 Homes That Changed America

10 Towns That Changed America

10 Parks That Changed America

10 Streets That Changed America

The chosen streets, in rough chronological order of establishment, were New York City's Broadway, the Boston Post Road linking Boston, MA to New York, NY, St. Charles Avenue in New Orleans, LA, the National Road linking Cumberland, MD to Vandalia, IL, Brooklyn's Eastern Parkway in New York City, Woodward Avenue in Detroit, MI, the Lincoln Highway from New York, NY to San Francisco, CA, Greenwood Avenue in Tulsa, OK, Wilshire Boulevard in Los Angeles, CA, and the Kalamazoo Mall outdoor pedestrian shopping mall at Kalamazoo, MI.

10 Monuments That Changed America

The chosen monuments were the Bunker Hill Monument at Boston, MA (1843), the Statue of Liberty (1886), Standing Soldiers monuments to Civil War dead (post 1865), the Robert Gould Shaw/54th Regiment Memorial at Boston, MA (1897), the Lincoln Memorial at Washington, DC (1922), Mount Rushmore (1941), the Gateway Arch at St. Louis, MO (1965), the Vietnam Veterans Memorial at Washington, DC (1982), the AIDS Memorial Quilt (1987), and the Oklahoma City National Memorial at Oklahoma City, OK (2000).

10 Modern Marvels That Changed America

The civil engineering feats were the Erie Canal (1825), the John A. Roebling Suspension Bridge across the Ohio River at Cincinnati, OH (1866), the Transcontinental Railroad (1869), the Eads Bridge across the Mississippi River at St. Louis, MO (1874), the Reversal of the Chicago River (1900), the Holland Tunnel under the Hudson River connecting New York, NY to Jersey City, NJ (1927), the Hoover Dam (1936), the Colorado River Aqueduct (1935), the Interstate Highway System (1956), and New Orleans' Hurricane and Storm Damage Risk Reduction System (2005)

Critical response

The initial episode on 10 Buildings That Changed America received mixed reviews from architecture critics. It was recognised as achieving the goal to "explain complex battles over architectural ideas, in clear language, to a broad audience". However, it was also criticised as lacking substance and failing to address "the historical, social and economic impact of these 10 buildings". The Minneapolis Star Tribune highlighted the series 1 episode covering 10 Homes That Changed America for informativeness on "influential homes that transformed residential living".

References

External links
 Official PBS series page
 Official WTTW series page
 10 Buildings That Changed America on Internet Movie Database
 10 Homes That Changed America on Internet Movie Database
 10 Towns That Changed America on Internet Movie Database
 10 Parks That Changed America on Internet Movie Database

PBS original programming
Television series by WTTW
2016 television specials
Television series about the history of the United States